Suck City is an EP by American noise rock group Cop Shoot Cop, released in 1992 by Big Cat Records and Interscope Records.

Track listing

Personnel
Adapted from the Suck City liner notes.

Cop Shoot Cop
Tod Ashley – lead vocals, high-end bass guitar
Jim Coleman – sampler, tape
Jack Natz – low-end bass guitar
Phil Puleo – drums, percussion

Production and additional personnel
Cop Shoot Cop – mixing
Martin Bisi – production, recording, mixing
Subvert Entertainment – cover art, design

Release history

References

External links 
 

1992 EPs
Cop Shoot Cop albums
Albums produced by Martin Bisi
Big Cat Records EPs
Interscope Records EPs